Gavin O'Toole (born 19 September 1975) is an Irish footballer who played in The Football League for Hereford United on loan from Coventry City.

References

Republic of Ireland association footballers
Coventry City F.C. players
Hereford United F.C. players
English Football League players
1975 births
Living people
Association footballers from Dublin (city)
Association football midfielders
21st-century Irish people